Gazeta de Nord-Vest (North-West Gazette) is a Romanian daily newspaper focused mainly on politics, public affairs, sports and economy. The first edition was printed in 1990.

References

External links
 Official website

Newspapers published in Satu Mare
Publications established in 1992